Mark Roberts (born January 19, 1961) is an American screenwriter, producer, playwright, actor, and comedian, best known for creating the American sitcom Mike & Molly.

Career
He appeared on The Tonight Show seven times as a stand-up comic between the years of 1992–1995, which led to guest starring roles on numerous television series and films, among them Seinfeld, Friends, The Practice, The Larry Sanders Show, Two and a Half Men, and Bulletproof.

He was also a series regular on the television comedy The Naked Truth.

His plays Where the Great Ones Run, Parasite Drag, and Rantoul and Die have been published by Dramatists Play Service and produced in various theaters in the United States.

He was the creator and executive producer of Mike & Molly, which premiered September 20, 2010 on CBS, until he left the show after season 3.  Mike & Molly was the highest-rated new comedy of the 2010 season.

References

External links
 

1961 births
American male comedians
American male film actors
American male screenwriters
American male television actors
Television producers from Illinois
American television writers
Place of birth missing (living people)
Living people
Writers from Urbana, Illinois
Showrunners
American male television writers
Screenwriters from Illinois
Comedians from Illinois
21st-century American comedians
21st-century American screenwriters
21st-century American male writers